Cynthia Hopkins is an American performance artist, composer, and musician.

Performance work
She has written, composed, and performed five works of performance art at a number of theaters around the world, including St. Ann's Warehouse in Brooklyn, New York, The Kitchen in Manhattan, and the Walker Art Center in Minneapolis, Minnesota. On December 21, 2012 she performed during and had her music performed on the John Hodgman: Ragnarok special, which was streamed on Netflix on June 20, 2013. Her work, This Clement World, was reviewed in The New York Times by Jason Zinoman and by Charles Isherwood.

In addition Hopkins' work as a solo performance artist, she regularly collaborates with Annie-B Parson and Paul Lazar of the Big Dance Theater and acts in other theatrical pieces. This work has included Alan Smithee Directed This Play (BAM Next Wave Festival 2015) and Ich, Kürbisgeist (The Kitchen 2014).

In her work as a performer, Hopkins sings and plays the accordion, guitar, piano, and the musical saw. As a musician, she has self-produced five full-length albums.

Discography
 The Truth: A Tragedy (2010)
 The Success of Failure (or, The Failure of Success) (2009)
 Must Don’t Whip ‘Um (2008)
 Accidental Nostalgia (2005)
 Alas Alack (2002)
 Devotionals (2001)
 Hooker (2000)
 Gloria Deluxe (1999)

Awards and Fellowships
Bessie Award
Obie Award (two-time winner)
Alpert Award in Theater (2007)
Guggenheim Fellowship (2010)
Foundation for Contemporary Arts Grants to Artists award (2015)

References

External links
 Cynthia Hopkins' Official Website
 MikeyPod Podcast interview with Cynthia Hopkins

Living people
Bessie Award winners
Obie Award recipients
American women songwriters
Year of birth missing (living people)
21st-century American women